Fernando José Mendes Rosas  (born 18 April 1946, in Lisbon) is a Portuguese historian, professor, and politician.

Early life and education 

Rosas was born on 18 April 1946. He studied at Pedro Nunes secondary school, and in 1961, he joined the school's Portuguese Communist Party organization, a party for which he was later a militant.

He entered University of Lisbon's Faculty of Law where he remained an active militant. He was arrested in the repressive wave of January, 1965, while he was directing the student association of his Faculty. The Estado Novo arrested dozens of activists from the main board of student resistance. He was tried and convicted in 1965. He served one year and three months at a correctional facility. As he left this facility he dedicated himself to supporting activities for arrested politicians.

The events of May 1968, and the Soviet invasion of Czechoslovakia, in August of the same year, led him to opt for the abandonment of the Communist Party. He participated in Portugal's first public protest against the Vietnam War, supported by sectors that were linked to the Students' Democratic Left-Wing, organization which he helped found in late 1968. It was as a politician responsible for this party that he organized the 1969 protests in Lisbon. He also participated in the second protest (this time centred on Coimbra).

In August 1971, he was arrested for the second time and taken to the headquarters of the PIDE political police. He was submitted to sleep torture for several days and then the regime's courts convicted him to 14 months at a correctional facility.

Upon his release, he returned to anti-fascist activism. In March 1973, he actively supported the campaign for the accusation of the murder of African socialist politician Amílcar Cabral. After a renewed attempt by the PIDE to imprison him, he escaped and went "underground" until the Carnation Revolution on 25 April 1974.

Up to 1979 he was editor of the Luta Popular newspaper ("People's struggle" in English). He represented this organization both times Ramalho Eanes ran for the presidency.

In 1981, Fernando Rosas returned to University and began dedicating himself to journalism as a profession. He coordinated the history page of Diário de Notícias and its cultural supplement. His collaboration with DN continued until 1992, a time when he integrated the fortnightly column of the pages of Público, another newspaper.

In 1986 he finished a Master's Degree in Contemporary History (19th and 20th century). He was invited to be assistant professor by the Faculty for Human and Social Sciences of Universidade Nova de Lisboa. In 1990 he got his Ph.D. and is today the president of the Instituto de História Contemporânea (Portugal's contemporary history institute), historical consultant for the Mário Soares Foundation and the editor of História magazine.

In 1996, he belonged to the Political Committee for the presidential candidature of Jorge Sampaio.

In 1999, he helped found the Left Bloc political party, whose Permanent Commission he leads. In 2001 he ran for President of the Republic, supported by the Left Bloc, receiving 3% of the vote.

In 2006 he was made a Commander of the Order of Liberty, by President Jorge Sampaio.

Rosas was a deputy for Lisbon in the Assembly of the Republic from 1999 to 2002 and for Setubal since 2005.

Electoral results

2001 Portuguese presidential election

Fernando Rosas finished fourth with 129,840 votes (3.00%).

Selected works

 As primeiras eleições legislativas sob o Estado Novo : as eleições de 16 de Dezembro de 1934, Cadernos O Jornal, 1985
 O Estado Novo nos Anos 30, Lisbon, Estampa, 1986
 O salazarismo e a Aliança Luso-Britânica : estudos sobre a política externa do Estado Novo nos anos 30 a 40, Lisbon, Fragmentos 1988
 Salazar e o Salazarismo (with JM Brandão de Brito), Publicacoes Dom Quixote, 1989, 
 Portugal Entre a Paz e a Guerra (1939/45), Lisbon, Estampa, 1990
 Portugal e o Estado Novo (1930/60), Vol. XII (ed), Nova História de Portugal, (gen. ed. A. H. de Oliveira Marques e Joel Serra), Lisbon, Editorial Presença, 1992
 O Estado Novo (1926/74), vol. VII, História Portugal (ed. J. Mattoso), 1994
 Dicionário de História do Estado Novo (with JM Brandão de Brito, ed.), Lisbon, Bertrand Editora, 1996
 Portugal e a Guerra Civil de Espanha (ed), Colibri, 1996, 
 Armindo Monteiro e Oliveira Salazar : correspondência política, 1926-1955 (ed.), Lisbon, Estampa, 1996, 
 Salazarismo e Fomento Económico, Lisbon, Noticias, 2000
 Portugal Século XX : Pensamento e Acção Política, Lisbon, Noticias, 2004
 Lisboa Revolucionária, Lisbon, Tinta da China, 2007, 
 História da Primeira República Portuguesa (with Maria Fernanda Rollo), Lisbon, Tinta da China, 2009, 
 Salazar e o Poder - A Arte de Saber Durar, Lisbon, Tinta da China, 2013, 
 Salazar e os Fascismos, Lisbon, Tinta da China, 2019,

References

1946 births
Living people
Candidates for President of Portugal
Left Bloc politicians
Portuguese Workers' Communist Party politicians
Portuguese Communist Party politicians